Tasmanian year book was the annual review of statistics collected for Tasmania.
It was a companion volume to Walch's Tasmanian Almanac bound in the same colour red cloth - and produced between 1967 and 2000. 
It was issued by the Commonwealth Bureau of Census and Statistics Tasmanian Office, later known as the Australian Bureau of Statistics office.
It had regular special articles in each edition which were considered definitive in their writing and approach.

Special articles
No.11 (1977) 
Townsley, W.A. The Tasmanian main line railway company (originally presented in 1956 to the Tasmanian Historical Research Association) pp. 6 – 22. along with photographs

Publishing details
No. 1 (1967)-no. 27 (2000) - Hobart, Tas. : Commonwealth Bureau of Census and Statistics, Tasmanian Office, 1967-2000. ISSN 0082-2116  (1987 not published)

External links
 www.abs.gov.au

History of Tasmania